Harmony Forge Mansion is a historic home and property. Originally it was the site of the Harmony Forge/Milesburg Iron Works, today the Harmony Forge Mansion survives, along with a large antique barn and a number of other outbuildings. It is a historic home and property located at Bellefonte, Centre County, Pennsylvania.  It was built between 1810 and 1820 by Joseph Miles. The Harmony Forge property dates back to the 1790s. The site is a landmark of the charcoal iron industry that prospered in Central Pennsylvania following the conclusion of the Revolutionary War.  The iron forge was constructed in 1795, on property purchased by Colonel Samuel Miles. Construction was supervised by ironmaster John Dunlop and the firm of Miles, Patton and Miles.  The construction of the mansion followed sometime thereafter, and can be dated to sometime between 1796 and 1820.  Colonel Miles never settled in Centre County, instead sending his sons John and Joseph to manage the forge and lay out the town of "Milesborough", now Milesburg, circa 1793.

It was added to the National Register of Historic Places in 1979.

References

Houses on the National Register of Historic Places in Pennsylvania
Houses completed in 1820
Houses in Centre County, Pennsylvania
National Register of Historic Places in Centre County, Pennsylvania